Uzuncaburç is a town in Mersin Province, Turkey.

Geography 

Uzuncaburç is in the rural area of Silifke district which is a part of Mersin Province. The population was 1502 as of 2012.

History 

Uzuncaburç is situated next to ruins of the ancient city Olba and the name of the town Uzuncaburç (after 1973) means  Tall bastion referring to the ruins. Uzuncaburç was declared township in 1992.

Economy 

Main crops are cereals and chickpea. There are also some vineyards. The secondary economic activity is sheep and goat breeding. Although touristic potential is great at the present tourism plays no important role in the economy of the town.

References

External links 
Travel link Turkey
History page 

Populated places in Mersin Province
Towns in Turkey
Tourist attractions in Mersin Province
Populated places in Silifke District